The  is a railway loop line in Japan operated by the West Japan Railway Company (JR West). It encircles central Osaka.

Part of a second, proposed outer loop line, the Osaka Higashi Line, from Hanaten to Kyuhoji was opened on March 15, 2008, and the line from Shigino to Shin-Ōsaka opened in March 2019. This entry covers the original central loop line.

Outline
The loop line consists of two tracks around the heart of metropolitan Osaka. All train services consist of eight cars, with distinctive orange color with white JR graphics on the front, rear and sides. The train schedule varies, but on average, two trains leave Tennōji Station and Ōsaka Station every five minutes, in opposite directions.

Operation

On this line, JR West operates several types of trains. The line serves as a link between Ōsaka Station in northern Osaka (actually the Umeda district), and Tennōji in southern central Osaka. Some Limited Express trains linking north and south of the Osaka-Kobe-Kyoto area use the line as a bypass between the Tōkaidō Main Line in the north and the Hanwa Line in the south. Traffic is heavier in the eastern half, Osaka - Kyōbashi - Tennōji, than in the western half via Nishi-Kujō.

Direction
The completely loop shaped Osaka Loop Line is unable to use the 'up' and 'down' train direction convention commonly applied in Japanese railways, e.g. trains traveling to Tokyo are usually 'up' trains and vice versa. The outer is clockwise, the inner counterclockwise.

If rules, such as the registration of the line at Ministry of Land, Infrastructure and Transport apply, the inner loop is down.

Local
Local trains are operated all day. Some operate over the complete loop, while some serve the eastern half between Osaka and Tennōji via Kyōbashi.

Eight-car EMUs of 323 series are used. 221 series, 223 series and 225 series are used only for morning rush.

Sakurajima Line trains
Trains of the Sakurajima Line (JR Yumesaki Line) are now operated through to the loop line to/from Kyōbashi and Tennoji.

Eight-car 323 series EMUs are used.

Rapids of Kansai Main Line
In the loop, Yamatoji Rapids pass some stations while Regional Rapids stop all.

For "Yamatoji Rapid" and "Regional Rapid", usually 8-car and 4+4 car 221 series EMUs are used.

Rapids of Hanwa Line
This pattern commenced in 1989, but increased significantly in 1994 on the opening of Kansai Airport.

8-car 223 series and 225 series EMUs in 4+4 formations are used for Kansai Airport and Kishūji rapids. 113 series 4-car units were used for rapids of Shin-Ōsaka -  in early morning and late night. They were withdrawn in 2010.

Limited express
Charged Limited Express services such as Haruka for Kansai International Airport, and south bound Kuroshio on the Hanwa Line and Kisei Main Line (Kinokuni Line) heading for the scenic southern Wakayama Prefecture utilize the Osaka Loop Line to bypass the Tōkaidō Main Line and reach the Hanwa Line. On the loop, aside from Tennōji, limited numbers of trains stop only at Nishi-Kujō.

Between the Tōkaidō Main Line and the Osaka Loop Line, trains utilize the "Umeda freight line" which crosses immediately west of Ōsaka Station, not stopping at Osaka because no passenger facilities are installed on the freight line, until it merges the main line at Shin-Ōsaka. This route was introduced in 1989 on the completion of a bypass track from the Hanwa Line to platforms of the Kansai Main Line at Tennōji. Until then no through operations were possible from the Hanwa Line.

281 series and 271 series EMUs are used for Haruka, 283 series EMUs, 287 series EMUs and 289 series EMUs for Kuroshio.

Freight trains

Stations
Listed counterclockwise: All stations are in the city of Osaka, Osaka Prefecture.

Stopping patterns

Stations
● : All trains stop.
▲ : Stop, outer loop (Tennoji → Nishikujo → Osaka → Kyobashi → Tennoji)
Number: Track (Platform) numbers to arrive at and depart from.
| : All trains skip

Rolling stock

Local
 323 series (since 24 December 2016)

The first of a fleet of 21 new 323 series eight-car EMU trains were introduced from 24 December 2016, scheduled to entirely replace the fleet of 23 103 and 201 series trains by 2018. As of December 2021, few of the remaining 103 series (from Nara Line) and 201 series (Osaka Higashi & Yamatoji Line) continue to be used on the Loop Line.

Yamatoji Rapid, Regional Rapid
 221 series

Kansai Airport Rapid, Kishūji Rapid, Direct Rapid and Local
 223 series (0 and 2500 subseries)
 225 series (5000 and 5100 subseries)

Limited express
 271 series (Haruka service, from Spring 2020)
 281 series (Haruka service)
 283 series (Kuroshio service)
 287 series (Kuroshio service)
 289 series (Kuroshio service)

Freight
Locomotives seen hauling freight trains include the M250 series, EF65, EF66, EF81, EF210 and DE10.

Former

Passenger
 72 series
 101 series (March 22, 1964 – April 28, 1991)
 103 series (1969– 3 October 2017)
 113 series (until December 10, 2011)
 381 series (Kuroshio service, until October 30, 2015)
 201 series ( 2005–7 June 2019)

Freight
 DD51

Fares
A special discount rate is applied for travels within the Osaka Loop Line, the Sakurajima Line and the segment between JR Namba Station and Tennōji Station of the Kansai Main Line (collectively called the ).
The following table is the rate for adult single-ride tickets. (Note: Fractions of one kilometre are rounded up to the nearest full kilometre.)

For travel between a station within the zone and a station out of the zone or between two stations out of the zone, fares are calculated in accordance with a universal fare table and the discount rate as above is not applicable.

For the calculation of the fare for travel between two stations out of the zone that includes the segment between Ōsaka Station and Tennōji Station of the Osaka Loop Line, where two routes ( route via Temma and  route via Fukushima) are practical, the shorter route is always used irrespective of the actual travel route.

History
The Osaka Loop Line consists of four segments, namely:
Jōtō Line
Eastern half of present line, Osaka - Tennōji via Kyōbashi
Nishinari Line
The northwestern quarter, Osaka - Nishi-Kujō
Kansai Main Line freight line
Southwestern portion, Tennōji - Sakaigawa Junction
Purpose-built section
The remainder to complete the loop, Nishi-Kujō - Sakaigawa Junction

Jōtō Line
The line was opened in 2 stages: Tennōji - Tamatsukuri (2 mi. 28 chain, ca. 3.8 km) on 28 May; and Tamatsukuri - Umeda (4 mi. 29 chain, ca. 7.0 km) on 17 October.

Earlier, in 1889, the company opened its main line from  - Tennōji -  which includes a short section of the Osaka Loop Line, being Tennōji - ; Imamiya station itself, located between Tennōji and Minatomachi, was opened in 1890.

The Kansai Railway was acquired by the national government in 1907 under the 1906 Railway Nationalization Act.

In 1930, distrances were changed to metric, thus the distance changed from 6.6 miles. to 10.7 km. Electrification of the Jōtō Line was commissioned in 1933.

Nishinari Line
In 1898, the company opened the Osaka -  line, which was leased to JGR in 1904. In 1906 the company was nationalized under the act of the same year.

The Nishinari Line was electrified in 1941.

Kansai Main Line Freight Line
The Tennōji to Sakaigawa Signal Box (between Taishō and Bentenchō, closed in 2006 when the branch to the port closed) section (south-western portion of the loop) was constructed for freight traffic by the JGR to the port area in 1928, connecting to a freight branch line of the Kansai Main Line, Imamiya -  -  with a distance of 5.2 mi. (ca. 8.4 km). In 1930 with the change to metric measurement, it became 8.2 km. The former Osaka-Minato and Osaka-Tōkō stations were closed in 1984.

Purpose-built loop line section
To complete the Loop Line, new tracks were constructed between Nishi-Kujō and Sakaigawa Signal Box by the then Japanese National Railways. In 1961, this section opened and the new Osaka Loop Line was named for the entirety of the then Jōtō Line, Osaka - Nishi-Kujō section of the Nishinari Line (the rest, Nishi-Kujō - Sakurajima was named the Sakurajima Line) and the new Nishi-Kujō - Taishō - Tennōji section.

In 1964, operation as a complete Loop Line commenced with the opening of elevated double tracks around Nishi-Kujō. Until then the operation had been undertaken in the shape of a mirrored "6", Sakurajima - Nishi-Kujō - Osaka - Kyōbashi - Tennōji - Nishi-Kujō. The Tennōji - Shin-Imamiya section was quadrupled in 1968, to separate operations from the Kansai Main Line.

See also
Yamanote Line
Osaka Higashi Line

References
This article incorporates material from the corresponding article in the Japanese Wikipedia

 
Railway loop lines
Railway lines opened in 1898
1067 mm gauge railways in Japan